Dolce is the sixth studio album by Japanese musician Ami Suzuki, her third release under Avex Trax. The album was original named "Connetta 2", but later changed. The album was released in three versions: a first press CD+Photobook, a CD+DVD, and a CD Only whose first press edition comes with an extra track "if" solely performed by Ami. The album has a stronger club feeling than Connetta. The album was released on February 6, 2008 and debuted on its first day on the Oricon Daily Chart at #10, ending up at #26 for the Weekly Chart; the same position as her previous album.

Track listing

Charts

Singles

References 

2008 albums
Ami Suzuki albums
Avex Group albums